The women's 200 metres T47 event at the 2020 Summer Paralympics in Tokyo took place on 4 September 2021.

Records
Prior to the competition, the existing records were as follows:

Results

Heats
Heat 1 took place on 4 September, at 11:54:

Heat 2 took place on 4 September, at 12:00:

Heat 3 took place on 4 September, at 12:06:

Final
The final took place on 4 September, at 19:50:

References

Women's 200 metres T47
2021 in women's athletics